William Burke (1912 – 23 January 1995) was an Irish hurler who played as a centre-back for the Kilkenny senior team.

Burke made his first appearance for the team during the 1934 championship and became a regular player over the next decade. During that time he won one All-Ireland winner's medal and four Leinster winner's medals.

At club level Burke played with the Tullaroan club.

References

1912 births
1995 deaths
Tullaroan hurlers
Kilkenny inter-county hurlers
All-Ireland Senior Hurling Championship winners